was a village located in Oki District, Shimane Prefecture, Japan.

As of 2003, the village had an estimated population of 520 and a density of 28.03 persons per km2. The total area was 18.55 km2.

On October 1, 2004, Fuse, along with the town of Saigō, and the villages of Goka and Tsuma (all from Oki District), was merged to create the town of Okinoshima.

Dissolved municipalities of Shimane Prefecture